Major-General Sir Stanley de Astel Calvert Clarke,  (died 29 November 1911) was a British Army officer and courtier.

Clarke was the son of John Frederick Sales Calvert-Clarke. He was educated at the Royal Military College, Sandhurst and commissioned into the 13th Hussars. He subsequently exchanged into the 4th Queen's Own Hussars and served with the regiment in India for five years.

On 15 September 1867 he married Mary Temple Rose, daughter of Sir John Rose, 1st Baronet. He and his wife were present at the 1877 Delhi Durbar. He went on to have 5 children, Edith, Millicent, Florence, Frederick and  Albert.

In 1878 Clarke, who was by this time a colonel, was appointed Equerry to the Prince of Wales and in 1886 he became Private Secretary to the Princess of Wales. He retired from the army on 20 September 1894, received the honorary rank of major-general six days later, and was invested as a Knight Commander of the Royal Victorian Order (KCVO) in 1897. After successfully taking part in the arrangements for the Coronation of King Edward VII and Queen Alexandra, he was appointed a Knight Grand Cross of the Royal Victorian Order (GCVO) two days after the ceremony, on 11 August 1902. He held the office of Clerk Marshal and Chief Equerry to Edward VII from 1 January 1904 and was Serjeant-at-Arms in the House of Lords from 1910 until he resigned in November.

References

Year of birth unknown
1911 deaths
4th Queen's Own Hussars officers
13th Hussars officers
Calvert family
Companions of the Order of St Michael and St George
English courtiers
Equerries
Graduates of the Royal Military College, Sandhurst
Knights Grand Cross of the Royal Victorian Order
Members of the Household of the Prince of Wales
Serjeants-at-arms of the House of Lords